Cecil McCallum (born 4 June 1902, date of death unknown) was a South African cricketer. He played in two first-class matches for Border in 1920/21.

See also
 List of Border representative cricketers

References

External links
 

1902 births
Year of death missing
South African cricketers
Border cricketers